Cheshmeh Kamareh is a village in Nurabad Rural District, in the Central District of Delfan County, Lorestan Province, Iran. At the 2006 census, its population was 22, in 7 families.

References 

Towns and villages in Delfan County